Elimbari Rural LLG is a local-level government (LLG) of Chimbu Province, Papua New Guinea. The Chuave language is spoken in the LLG.

Wards
01. Monono
02. Gogo No.1
03. Gogo No.2
04. Kuraigure
05. Kurere 1
06. Kurere 2
07. Giriu No.1
08. Giriu No.2
09. Wangoi
10. Kororume No.1
11. Kururume
12. Yorori
13. Pimuri No.2
14. Pimuri (Oroma)
15. Karaweri No.1
16. Karaweri No.2

Provincial Government Members
The Provincial Government Members (PGM) of Elimbari Rural LLG are:

 Chief Teine Agyonga: 1964-1983
 Dama Sipa: 1983-1988
 Bob Gioga: 1988-1994
 Teimai Timothy Komane: 1994-1999

References

Local-level governments of Chimbu Province